Thabit is an Arabic name for males that means "the imperturbable one". It is sometimes spelled Thabet.

People with the patronymic
 Ibn Thabit, Libyan hip-hop musician
 Asim ibn Thabit, companion of Muhammad
 Hassan ibn Sabit (died 674), poet and companion of Muhammad
 Khuzaima ibn Thabit (died 657), companion of Muhammad
 Sinan ibn Thabit (c. 880 – 943), physician and mathematician
 Zayd ibn Thabit (c. 610 – 660), personal scribe of Muhammad
 Abdullah Thabit (born 1973), Saudi Arabian poet, novelist and journalist

People with the given name
 Thabit ibn Qays, companion of Muhammad
 Thabit ibn Qurra (c. 826 – 901), Baghdadi mathematician and astronomer

See also
 Thabit number
 Tabit (town) (or Thabit), Sudan
 Upsilon Orionis or Thabit – a star in the constellation Orion
 Sabit, the Turkish equivalent of Thabit